Lusine is an Armenian origin feminine given name. People with the name include:

 Lusine Aghabekyan (born 1990), Armenian musician
 Lusine Badalyan (born 1980), Armenian television presenter and politician
 Lusine Gevorkyan (born 1983), Armenian musician
 Lusine Hovhannisyan (born 1990), Armenian football player
 Lusine Tovmasyan (born 1986),  Armenian beauty pageant contestant and model
 Lusine Zakaryan (1937–1992), Armenian musician

See also 
 Lusine, the stage name of Jeff McIlwain

Armenian feminine given names